Irene Zechner, born Irene Koch, was an Austrian luger who competed from the mid-1980s to 1996. A natural track luger, she won four medals in the women's singles event at the FIL World Luge Natural Track Championships with a gold in 1996, two silver medals in 1990 and 1994 and a bronze in 1992.

Zechner also won two gold medals in the women's singles event at the FIL European Luge Natural Track Championships (1993 and 1995), one silver medal in 1991 and two bronze medals in 1987 and 1989.

References
Natural track European Championships results 1970-2006.
Natural track World Championships results: 1979-2007

Austrian female lugers
Living people
Year of birth missing (living people)
20th-century Austrian women